Apatelodes gaveta is a moth in the family Apatelodidae.

References

Natural History Museum Lepidoptera generic names catalog

Apatelodidae
Moths described in 1894